The women's 400 metre individual medley competition of the swimming event at the 2015 Southeast Asian Games was held on 6 June at the OCBC Aquatic Centre in Kallang, Singapore.

Records
Prior to this competition, the existing Asian and Games records were as follows:

The following records were established during the competition:

Schedule

Results

Heat 1

The first round was held on 6 June.

Heat 2

The second round was held on 6 June.

Final

The final was held on 6 June.

References

External links
 

Women's 400 metre individual medley
Women's sports competitions in Singapore
2015 in women's swimming